Adrian Vickers  is an Australian author, historian and professor of Southeast Asian Studies at the University of Sydney. He writes a blog on Indonesian subjects. He has studied and documented Gambuh dance traditions, Panji (prince) stories, and other Indonesian art and cultural subjects as well as historiography and colonialism. He has a BA and PhD from the University of Sydney, is the Professor of Southeast Asian Studies (Personal Chair) and Director of the Asian Studies Program. Vickers' most recent book, The Pearl Frontier, co-written with Julia Martínez, won the University of Southern Queensland History Book Award at the 2016 Queensland Literary Awards. He is a fellow of the Australian Academy of the Humanities.

Bibliography

References 

Academic staff of the University of Sydney
Year of birth missing (living people)
Living people
Australian sociologists
Historians of Southeast Asia
Australian historians
University of Sydney alumni
Fellows of the Australian Academy of the Humanities